Sir Frederick John Burrows GCSI, GCIE (3 July 1887 – 20 April 1973) was a British politician who served as the last British  Governor of Bengal during the British Raj in India. He was Governor of Bengal from 19 February 1946 to 14 August 1947. He was against the partition of Bengal. Burrows was a former Ross railway man and he was the president of the National Union of Railwaymen, the union representing railway workers in England.

Sir Adrian Carton de Wiart records: "He had endeared himself to the Burrah Sahibs of Calcutta (Kolkata) with one of his first speeches when, alluding to his modest beginning on the railway, he said, 'When you gentlemen were huntin' and shootin', I was shuntin' and hootin'. He seemed to me to be far more proud of having been a sergeant-major in the Grenadier Guards in the First World War than he was of being Governor of Bengal."

References

1887 births
1973 deaths
British governors of Bengal
Politicians from Kolkata
Knights Grand Commander of the Order of the Star of India
Knights Grand Commander of the Order of the Indian Empire
British trade union leaders
Grenadier Guards soldiers
British Army personnel of World War I
Presidents of the National Union of Railwaymen
British people in colonial India